Leuphana University Lüneburg is a public university in Lüneburg, Lower Saxony, Germany. Leuphana was founded in 1946 as a college of education (Pädagogische Hochschule). Leuphana established a unique university model within the German academic landscape that has received several awards. Leuphana University is one of the few universities in Europe to offer a liberal arts programme with their bachelor's programme Studium Individuale. The university is designated as a "foundation under public law".

The name Leuphana is derived from an ancient settlement on the Elbe that was mentioned in a 2nd-century geographical world atlas by Ptolemy.

Leuphana College concentrates its bachelor's degree studies into eight departments and two teacher training courses. In 2008, a graduate college was opened that integrates master's degree and doctorate programmes. In addition are a pan-departmental research centre and a professional school for advanced study courses, like business co-operation.

History 
Leuphana was founded in May 1946 as one of eight colleges of education (pädagogische Hochschule) in Lower Saxony, and was renamed in May 1989 from Pädagogische Hochschule Lower Saxony, Abteilung Lüneburg to Lüneburg University.

In 2009, the campus in Suderburg was transferred to the Fachhochschule Braunschweig/Wolfenbüttel (Ostfalia University of Applied Studies).

Notable staff and alumni 

 Daniel Libeskind, visiting professor
 Richard David Precht, visiting professor
 Britt Reinecke, television talk show host
 Tine Wittler, writer, TV presenter and actress
 Jörg Philipp Terhechte, professor and dean

References

External links 
 Leuphana Universität Lüneburg
 AStA der Universität Lüneburg
 Kunstraum of Leuphana University Lüneburg
 Lehrstuhl für Gründungsmanagement (gmlg)

 
Lüneburg
Educational institutions established in 1946
Universities and colleges in Lower Saxony
1946 establishments in Germany